Sigmen Glacier is a 2.2 km long and 2 km wide glacier draining the northwest slopes of Brugmann Mountains on Liège Island in the Palmer Archipelago, Antarctica.  It is situated northeast of Zbelsurd Glacier and southwest of Shterna Glacier, draining the west-southwest slopes of Vazharov Peak and the northwest slopes of Mount Kozyak, and flows northwestwards to enter Palakariya Cove.

The glacier is named after the settlement of Sigmen in southeastern Bulgaria.

Location
British mapping in 1978.

See also
 List of glaciers in the Antarctic
 Glaciology

Maps
 British Antarctic Territory.  Scale 1:200000 topographic map.  DOS 610 Series, Sheet W 64 60.  Directorate of Overseas Surveys, UK, 1978.
 Antarctic Digital Database (ADD). Scale 1:250000 topographic map of Antarctica. Scientific Committee on Antarctic Research (SCAR), 1993–2016.

References
 Bulgarian Antarctic Gazetteer. Antarctic Place-names Commission. (details in Bulgarian, basic data in English)
 Sigmen Glacier. SCAR Composite Antarctic Gazetteer

External links
 Sigmen Glacier. Copernix satellite image

Glaciers of the Palmer Archipelago
Bulgaria and the Antarctic
Liège Island